M. Rainer Lepsius (8 May 1928 – 2 October 2014) was a German sociologist.  A particular interest was in the work of Max Weber: he was prominent among the co-compilers of the (eventually) 47 volume edition of the Complete Works of Weber.

Life
Mario Rainer Lepsius was born in Rio de Janeiro, at that time the capital of Brazil.   His Portuguese first name reflected the country where the family lived when he was born, while his second name reflected the German provenance of the family.   After moving to Germany he would stop using the name "Mario", substituting the initial "M", which is why most sources identify him as "M. Rainer Lepsius".

On his father's side Lepsius came from a prominent Berlin family.   His mother, the daughter of a Munich judge, came from a middle class Protestant Franconian family, with a number of lawyers, doctors and pastors among her ancestors.   His father, Wilhelm Lepsius (1890-1942) had a doctorate in law, and by the time of Rainer's birth was working in a commercial capacity for Schering AG, a large pharmaceutical company headquartered in Berlin.  In 1934, when Lepsius was aged six, the family relocated to Madrid which is where he first attended school.   Two years later, in 1936, they returned to Germany, settling in Munich where the child grew up, and where he was still living when he was fourteen, which was when his father died.   Less than three years later, on his seventeenth birthday, he was in Munich on 8 May 1945 when the capitulation of the German army marked the formal end of the Second World War.

Between 1947 and 1952 he studied history, social economics (Volkswirtschaftslehre) and sociology at Munich and Cologne. He received his first degree from Munich in 1950. His doctorate, also from Munich, followed in 1955. In Cologne he was one of the so-called "young Turks" drawn to the ideas of René König, and from this point his academic focus was almost exclusively on sociology. Gerhard Weisser triggered his interest in town planning. In Autumn 1951, during an extended stay in London, he was able to pursue his studies at the London School of Economics. It was also in London that he met Renate Meyer whom he would later marry.

After this Friedrich Lütge offered him a post a seminar assistant in Economic History back at Munich, which made Lepsius and Knut Borchardt colleagues.

In 1955/56 Lepsius won a Fulbright scholarship which led to a year spent at Columbia University in New York, studying with Robert K. Merton, whom he found a "lucid teacher"  and Paul Lazarsfeld as his "student advisor".   At the end of his year he was offered a position as a research assistant by Reinhard Bendix at Berkeley, but after a certain amount of soul searching decided to return to West Germany and participate in the postwar reconstruction of the country's academic base.   Between 1957 and 1963 he worked for his former tutor Alfred von Martin as a research assistant at the newly established Munich University Institute for Sociology where he played a central role both in the day-to-day teaching and as an administrator, working closely with the institute director Emerich K. Francis who, like Lepsius, had been persuaded by Alfred von Martin to return from the United States.

In 1963 Lepsius received from Munich his habilitation (post-doctoral qualification) for a piece of work critiquing the Functionalist Theory of social organisation.   He subsequently expressed regret that the dissertation had never been published: however, in 2015 it was published posthumously, complete with a foreword by his son, Oliver Lepsius and a thoughtful introduction by his fellow Weber scholar, Wolfgang Schluchter.

1963 was also the year in which he moved from Munich to the National Economic Academy ("Staatliche Wirtschaftshochschule") in Mannheim (rebranded in 1967 as the University of Mannheim).   Here he held a full professorship in Sociology until 1981 when he moved again. In 1981 he took a leading position at the then threatened Sociology department at Heidelberg University, where he held an equivalent professorship until he became an emeritus professor in 1993.

Memberships
Between 1971 and 1974 Lepsius chaired the German Sociological Association.   He was a member of several learned institutions:  from 1977 a full member of the Heidelberg Academy of Sciences and Humanities, from 1992 a corresponding member of the Bavarian Academy of Sciences and Humanities, and from 2004 a foreign member of the Turin Academy of Sciences and Humanities.

Evaluation and scope
Lepsius was considered one of the leading western researchers and theoreticians of contemporary society.   Like most sociologists of the postwar generation, he started out as an "industry sociologist":  like all the better known sociologists of that generation, he was a member of the "Export Committee for Industry Sociology" at the German Sociological Association ("Fachausschuss für Industriesoziologie der Deutschen Gesellschaft für Soziologie").

A particular interest was in the work of Max Weber: he was prominent among the co-compilers of the (eventually) 47 volume edition of the Complete Works of Weber.   His research work also embraced both historical and contemporary social structure analyses.   He also worked extensively on political sociology and on the European Union.   Lepsius powerfully influenced the political culture through his work on the social environment.

References

People from Rio de Janeiro (city)
Academic staff of the Ludwig Maximilian University of Munich
German sociologists
Academic staff of the University of Mannheim
Academic staff of Heidelberg University
German editors
Members of the Bavarian Academy of Sciences
1928 births
2014 deaths